Mikael Harutyuni Harutyunyan (born 10 February 1946) was the 7th Defence Minister of Armenia from 4 April 2007 until 14 April 2008. From 14 April 2008 to 24 May 2018, he has served as Chief Military Inspector and Presidential Advisor to the President of Armenia.

Early life and career
Harutyunyan was born and grew up in the village of Sagiyan, Shamakhi in central Azerbaijan SSR. He graduated from a Soviet military college in Baku in 1967. Harutyunyan served in the Soviet armed forces, in the Soviet Army platoon from 1967 and then the commander of the reconnaissance from 1971. He was chief of motorized infantry division from 1976 to 1982. Afterward, Harutyunyan help positions in the Army Corps and Army Guard. In 1976 Colonel General Harutyunyan graduated from the Reconnaissance Department of Frunze Military Academy. In 1988 he graduated from the USSR Armed Forces General Staff Military Academy. He was the senior lecturer of the Military Academy from 1988 to 1992. In 1992, by the Order of CIS Joint Armed Forces Chief Commander, Harutyunyan was sent to Armenia and was assigned as the First Deputy Chief of General Staff of Armenian Armed Forces - Head of Operational Department.

In 1994 he was promoted to the rank of Major General and was assigned as the Chief of General Staff of Armenian Armed Forces - First Deputy Minister of Defence. In 1996 he was promoted to the rank of Lieutenant General and in 2002 to the rank of Colonel General by the decree of the President of Armenia.

Appointment as Defence Minister
On 26 March 2007, Serzh Sargsyan, who was the Defence Minister, was appointed Prime Minister of Armenia after the sudden death of Andranik Margaryan. The post was vacant until 4 April 2007 when Colonel-General Mikael Harutyunyan was appointed to the post of Defence Minister. Before being appointed to the post, Harutyunyan was First Deputy Defence Minister.

Appointment as Advisor to the President
On 14 April 2008, the newly elected president of Armenia, Serzh Sargsyan (former Prime Minister of Armenia), signed two decrees: one appointing Mikael Harutyunyan as Chief Military Inspector, and another appointing him as a Presidential Advisor, with the hope that his skill and experience would prove useful in the continual development of the military. Replacing Mikael Harutyunyan in his Minister of Defence post was Seyran Ohanyan.

Personal life
He is the youngest male in a family of 5 sisters and 2 brothers. His entire family members left Azerbaijan after the beginning of the Nagorno-Karabakh conflict, including his elder brother Vladimir, who also joined the army. His sister Zoya Arutyunova currently resides in Kürdəmir in central Azerbaijan, and his nephew has served in Nakhchivan in the Azerbaijani Armed Forces.

Awards
He is a recipient of orders and decorations of USSR, the Republic of Armenia and foreign states:

 Order of the Combat Cross, 2nd degree
 Medal "For Services to the Fatherland", 1st degree
 Medal "For Services to the Fatherland", 2nd degree
 Vardan Mamikonian Order
 Order of Nerses the Gracious
 Mesrop Mashtots Medal
 Medal of Marshal Baghramyan
 Andranik Ozanyan Medal
 Medal "For Distinguished Service", 1st class
 Medal "For Distinguished Service", 2nd class
 Order of the Combat Cross, 2nd degree
 Legion of Honour
 Medal "For strengthening military cooperation"

See also
 First Nagorno-Karabakh War
 Nagorno-Karabakh conflict
 Seyran Ohanyan
 Seyran Shahsuvaryan

References

External links

1946 births
Living people
People from Shamakhi
Armenian generals
Frunze Military Academy alumni
Military Academy of the General Staff of the Armed Forces of the Soviet Union alumni
Nagorno-Karabakh
Government ministers of Armenia
Defence ministers of Armenia
Chiefs of the General Staff (Armenia)